Bernard Lafaille (2 April 1900 in Reims, France - 24 June 1955 in Paris, France) was a French engineer. He graduated from the École Centrale Paris in 1923 and was active until his death in 1955.

Famous works
Some of his most famous works include:
 Church of Our Lady in Royan
 Roundabout of Hirson station
 Roundabout of Longueau station
 The French pavillon at the international Zagreb expo in 1937
 SNCF in Pantin
 Roundabout for locomotives in Avignon
 Les Gonaïves church in Haiti
 Notre-Dame-de-France church in Bizerte, Tunisia
 Notre-Dame-de-la-Paix church in Villeparisis

References

1900 births
1955 deaths
People from Reims
20th-century French engineers
École Centrale Paris alumni